Ilene Chaiken (born June 30, 1957) is an American television producer, director, writer, and founder of Little Chicken Productions. Chaiken is best known as being a co-creator, writer and executive producer on the television series The L Word, and was recently an executive producer on Empire, The Handmaid's Tale, and Law & Order: Organized Crime.

Early life and education
Chaiken was born in Elkins Park, Pennsylvania to a Jewish family. She studied at the Rhode Island School of Design and graduated with an undergraduate degree in graphic design in 1979.

Career 
She began her career as an agent trainee for Creative Artists Agency, and as an executive for Aaron Spelling and Quincy Jones Entertainment. In 1988, she was the coordinating producer for the Fresh Prince of Bel Air and the associate producer for Satisfaction. She then wrote the screenplay Barb Wire (1996), and the television films Dirty Pictures (2000), and Damaged Care (2002). Dirty Pictures won the Golden Globe for Best Miniseries or Television Film in 2000.

Chaiken co-created The L Word in 2004, inspired largely by her own experiences as a lesbian. Her first romance with another woman, which ended in heartbreak when the woman revealed she had a long-distance girlfriend, served as a loose inspiration for the relationship of the characters Marina Ferrer and Jenny Schecter.

In 2007, she and a group of women in the entertainment and tech industries launched a social networking site called OurChart for lesbians and their friends. OurChart was online until 2008, when it was shutdown. At that time, a spin-off show of The L Word entitled The Farm was in development and two pilots were being written by Chaiken, although Showtime never bought the series.

Chaiken produced a documentary for Showtime in 2014 titles L Word Mississippi: Hate the Sin. The film focused on multiple lesbian women, telling their experiences of being gay in the Deep South. During this time, Chaiken was also a showrunner on ABC's The Black Box, which was cancelled after one season.

Chaiken is credited with first developing the TV adaptation of The Handmaid's Tale, which became a successful Hulu original show. Chaiken left the project during development to become the show-runner on Fox's Empire, but was still credited as an executive producer.

In January 2019, Showtime announced that it had ordered a full season of the sequel to The L Word. The show aired December 8, 2019, titled The L Word: Generation Q, and picks up where the original series ended, set ten years later.

More recently, her company, Little Chicken Productions, signed an overall deal with Universal Television. In 2020, Chaiken co-created the show Law & Order: Organized Crime, a spin-off of the long-running series Law & Order.  The following year, she worked as a writer and showrunner for the series, but was replaced by Barry O'Brien part-way through production of the second season.

Personal life 
Chaiken has been married to LouAnne Brickhouse, a former executive at Disney, since 2013.  They live in the Laurel Canyon area of the Hollywood Hills in Los Angeles and have nurtured more than 100 species of birds and other fauna, which they document regularly on an Instagram account.

Chaiken is co-parent to twin daughters Tallulah and Augusta with her former partner, English architect Miggi Hood.

Filmography

Television

Awards

See also
 List of female film and television directors
 List of lesbian filmmakers
 List of LGBT-related films directed by women

References

External links

1957 births
Living people
20th-century American screenwriters
20th-century American women writers
21st-century American screenwriters
21st-century American women writers
American television directors
American television writers
American women screenwriters
American LGBT screenwriters
American lesbian artists
American lesbian writers
LGBT television directors
Lesbian screenwriters
Showrunners
American women television directors
American women television producers
American women television writers
Jewish American screenwriters
Lesbian Jews
LGBT people from California
Screenwriters from California
Television producers from California
People from Laurel Canyon, Los Angeles
LGBT people from Pennsylvania
Television producers from Pennsylvania
People from Montgomery County, Pennsylvania
Rhode Island School of Design alumni
Empire (2015 TV series)
Screenwriters from Pennsylvania